Leland Bennett Yeager (October 4, 1924 – April 23, 2018) was an American economist dealing with monetary policy and international trade.

Biography
Yeager graduated from Oberlin College in 1948 with an A.B. and was granted an M.A. from Columbia University in 1949 and a Ph.D. from there in 1952. He had previously served in the United States Army in World War II, translating Japanese codes. He temporarily served as the Vice President of the Interlingua Institute from 1997 to 1998 after Deanna Hammond died.  He has been a regular contributor to Liberty magazine and an occasional contributor to the "Mises Daily".

He was a Professor Emeritus at both Auburn University and the University of Virginia. His monetary writings have strongly opposed Keynesian orthodoxy and have emphasized the crucial role of money in business cycles. His 1956 essay, "A Cash-Balance Interpretation of Depression" maintained that depression was caused by "an excess demand for money, in the sense that people want to hold more money than exists." In this, he was a member of the monetarist school exemplified by Milton Friedman.

His subsequent writings tilted towards a laissez-faire approach to monetary reform. In his 1989 paper "Can Monetary Disequilibrium Be Eliminated", he advocated that government "be banished from any role in the monetary system other than that of defining a unit of account or numeraire." Yeager argued in favor of constitutional monarchy.

The month before his death Yeager wrote about the "destructive and ignorant" trade policy of United States President Donald Trump. Yeager died in April 2018 at the age of 93.

Bibliography
 Foreign Trade and U.S. Policy: The Case for Free International Trade (1976) 
 International Monetary Relations: Theory, History and Policy (1976) 
 Proposals for government credit allocation: Evaluative studies in economic policy (1977) 
 Experiences With Stopping Inflation (1981) 
 The Fluttering Veil: Essays on Monetary Disequilibrium (1997) 
 Ethics As Social Science: The Moral Philosophy of Social Cooperation (2001) 
 Is the Market a Test of Truth and Beauty? Essays in Political Economy (Full Text). (2012)

See also
 Journal of Libertarian Studies

References

1924 births
2018 deaths
Economists from Illinois
American libertarians
Auburn University faculty
Cato Institute people
Libertarian theorists
Military personnel from Illinois
Mises Institute people
University of Virginia faculty
Writers from Oak Park, Illinois
American monarchists